"Yes" (stylized in all caps) is a song by American rappers Fat Joe and Cardi B and Puerto Rican rapper Anuel AA. The song was released on September 6, 2019, as the second single from Fat Joe and Dre's collaborative album, Family Ties (2019).

Background and composition
About the creation of "Yes", Fat Joe said that "this one is special, you know what I'm sayin? Puff Daddy told me and Cool way back in the day that every hit record has a story, and geeze ... let's just put it this way: This one was months in the making, but it was worth the wait ... I think y'all really gonna fuck with it".

"Yes" is a bilingual hip hop song, with Anuel AA's verse being entirely in Spanish. Cardi B rebrands herself as “La Caldi” on the song.

"Yes" uses a sample of the 1972 hit song "Aguanilé", by salsa musicians Héctor Lavoe and Willie Colón, throughout the song.

Charts

Release history

References

2019 singles
2019 songs
Fat Joe songs
Cardi B songs
Anuel AA songs
Song recordings produced by Cool & Dre
Empire Distribution singles